The following is the list of mosques in Hong Kong:

See also
 Islam in Hong Kong
 Incorporated Trustees of the Islamic Community Fund of Hong Kong
 List of mosques in China

References

 
Hong
Hong Kong
Mosques